Whittlesey Workhouse was a workhouse in the Cambridgeshire town of Whittlesey. Its use as a workhouse ceased in 1930 and it was subsequently demolished.

History
The facility has its origins in a workhouse in Broad Street (formerly Old Tavern Street) built in the early 19th century. This was replaced by a new workhouse built by Frederick Peck on the north side of Eastrea Road in 1875. The new facility had a distinctive tall tower. It became the Whittlesey Poor Law Institution in the 1920s and was closed in the mid 1930s. After the workhouse had been demolished in the late 1930s, Sir Harry Smith Community College was built on the site in the early 1950s.

References

Buildings and structures in Cambridgeshire
Workhouses in Cambridgeshire
Whittlesey
Buildings and structures demolished in the 1930s